Sylvie Pissis (born 24 February 1963) is a French archer. She competed in the women's individual event at the 2000 Summer Olympics.

References

External links
 

1963 births
Living people
French female archers
Olympic archers of France
Archers at the 2000 Summer Olympics
Place of birth missing (living people)